Younesi is a surname. Notable people with the surname include: 

Ali Younesi (born 1951), Iranian politician
Ebrahim Younesi, Kurdish writer
Michael Younesi, American filmmaker
Tarik Elyounoussi, Swedish footballer